Weymouth can refer to:

Places
In the United Kingdom
Weymouth, Dorset, England
Weymouth and Melcombe Regis (UK Parliament constituency)
Weymouth and Portland, the abolished local government district
Weymouth Bay
Weymouth Beach
Weymouth Harbour, Dorset
Weymouth Harbour Tramway
Weymouth Pavilion
Weymouth railway station
Weymouth Quay railway station

In the United States
Weymouth, Massachusetts
Weymouth, Ohio
Weymouth Township, New Jersey
Weymouth, Atlantic County, New Jersey
Weymouth Hall, a historic mansion in Natchez, Mississippi

Elsewhere
Weymouth, Tasmania, Australia
Weymouth Bay, Queensland, Australia
Weymouth, Nova Scotia, Canada
Weymouth, New Zealand
Weymouth, Saint Michael, Barbados

Other uses
Weymouth F.C.
Weymouth College
HMS Weymouth, several ships
19294 Weymouth
Weymouth New Testament

People with the surname
Ceawlin Thynn, Viscount Weymouth
George Weymouth (c.1585-c.1612), English explorer
George W. Weymouth (1850–1910), American politician
Katharine Weymouth, former publisher of The Washington Post
Lally Weymouth, American journalist
Ralph Weymouth (1917-2020), Vice Admiral of the United States Navy
Richard Francis Weymouth (1822-1902), English Bible scholar
Thomas Thynne, 1st Marquess of Bath (1734–1796), 3rd Viscount Weymouth
Tina Weymouth, bassist for Talking Heads/Tom Tom Club
Yann Weymouth, architect

Waymouth variation
Henry Waymouth (1791–1848), one of the British founding directors of the South Australian Company in 1835, was sometimes spelt Henry Weymouth

See also
Weymouth bit
Double bridle or Weymouth bridle
Weymouth and Portland National Sailing Academy
Weymouth Wildcats
Weymouth Sands, a novel by John Cowper Powys
Weymouth Harbour (disambiguation)
Waymouth (surname list – variant spelling)